Cairbre mac Cinaedh, King of Umaill, died 847.

Almost nothing appears to be known of Cairbre. The Annals of the Four Masters record his death in 847.

External links
 Annals of the Four Masters

References
 The History of Mayo, pp. 388–89, T.H. Knox, 1908.

9th-century Irish monarchs
People from County Mayo